There are several socialist political parties with the name Left Party:

 Estonian Left Party, in Estonian: Eesti Vasakpartei, 1990–2008
 Estonian United Left Party in Estonian: Eestimaa Ühendatud Vasakpartei, formed in 2008
 Left Bloc (Portugal), in Portuguese: Bloco de Esquerda
 Left Party (France), in French: Parti de gauche
 Left Party (Sweden), in Swedish: Vänsterpartiet
 Left Party – Zona Franca, San Marino, in Italian: Partito della Sinistra – Zona Franca
 Party of the European Left, a party at the European level
 Socialist Left Party (Norway), in Norwegian: Sosialistisk Venstreparti (SV)
 The Left (Germany) or Left Party
 Party of Democratic Socialism (Germany), in German: Die Linkspartei.PDS

See also
Left Alliance (disambiguation)
The Left (disambiguation)
 Lewica (disambiguation)